The nagak (also called na, sora, or godong) is a large seashell played as a horn in Korean traditional music.  It produces only a single tone and is used primarily in the military procession music called daechwita. The nagak has a structure that makes a mouthpiece by making a hole in the pointed end and blows out a sound.

The shell is that of a very large sea snail, Charonia tritonis, sometimes known as "Triton's trumpet". This shell is also used as a musical instrument in several other nations.

See also
Conch (musical instrument)
Horagai, a similar shell horn used in Japan
Music of Korea
Shankha
Traditional Korean musical instruments

References

External links
 나각 at Korean National Heritage Online

Korean musical instruments
Natural horns and trumpets